Agonopterix dubatolovi is a moth in the family Depressariidae. It was described by Alexandr L. Lvovsky in 1995. It is found in Russia, where it has been recorded from Chita Oblast.

References

Moths described in 1995
Agonopterix
Moths of Asia